The 1960 North Dakota gubernatorial election was held on November 8, 1960. Democratic nominee William L. Guy defeated Republican nominee Clarence P. Dahl with 49.44% of the vote.

Primary elections
Primary elections were held on June 28, 1960.

Democratic primary

Candidates
William L. Guy, State Representative

Results

Republican primary

Candidates
Clarence P. Dahl, incumbent Lieutenant Governor
Orris G. Nordhougen, State Senator

Results

General election

Candidates
Major party candidates
William L. Guy, Democratic
Clarence P. Dahl, Republican 

Other candidates
Herschel Lashkowitz, Independent

Results

References

1960
North Dakota
Gubernatorial
November 1960 events in the United States